PJSC Lysychansk Oil Investment Company is the second largest oil refinery in Ukraine, capable of refining 16 million tons of oil per year. It is located at Verkhnokamyanka, Luhansk Oblast, about 10 km from the outskirts of Lysychansk city. Russian forces attacked the refinery in April 2022 and captured it in June, during the Battle of Lysychansk of the 2022 Russian invasion of Ukraine.

See also

 Kremenchuk Oil Refinery
 Odesa Refinery
 Glusco (gas stations)

References

Companies established in 1976
Companies of Ukraine by city
Economy of Luhansk Oblast
Lysychansk
1976 establishments in Ukraine
History of Luhansk Oblast
Oil refineries in Ukraine
Oil refineries in the Soviet Union